The Australian Tag Team Wrestling Championship was one of the first Tag team professional wrestling championship in Australia.

Title history

See also

Professional wrestling in Australia

References

Tag team wrestling championships
Continental professional wrestling championships
National professional wrestling championships
Professional wrestling in Australia